The Central Asian Volleyball Association , is the governing body for the sports of indoor, beach and grass volleyball in Central Asia and South Asia.

In the spirit of the FIVB 2001 Plan, AVC was the first to create five Zonal Associations at the 10th General Assembly in December 1993 prior to the FIVB Centennial Congress in September 1994.

Members associations

Ranking

Men's national teams

Senior team
Rankings are calculated by FIVB.

Last updated: 17 November 2020

Women's national teams

Senior team
Rankings are calculated by FIVB.

Last updated: 17 November 2020

Executive committee

Competitions
2015 Asian Central Championship

2016 Asian Central Championship

2017 Asian Central Championship

2018 Asian Central Championship

2019 Asian Central Championship

2022 Asian Central Championship

Volleyball

Beach volleyball

See also 

 East Asian Zonal Volleyball Association
 Oceania Zonal Volleyball Association
 Southeast Asian Volleyball Association

References

External links
  
 

Sports organizations established in 1993
1993 establishments in Asia
Volleyball in Asia